The British Grand Prix 2012 is the 2012's British Grand Prix (squash), which is a tournament of the PSA World Tour event International (Prize money : 70 000 $). The event took place at the National Squash Centre in Manchester in England from 21 to 24 September. Nick Matthew won his first British Grand Prix trophy, beating James Willstrop in the final.

Prize money and ranking points
For 2012, the prize purse was $70,000. The prize money and points breakdown is as follows:

Seeds

Draw and results

See also
PSA World Tour 2012
British Grand Prix (squash)

References

External links
PSA British Grand Prix 2012 website
British Grand Prix official website

Squash tournaments in the United Kingdom
British Grand Prix Squash
British Grand Prix Squash
British Grand Prix Squash
2010s in Manchester
British Grand Prix Squash
Sports competitions in Manchester